Polytelodes is a genus of moths of the family Noctuidae.

Species
 Polytelodes florifera (Walker, 1858)

References
Natural History Museum Lepidoptera genus database
Polytelodes at funet

Glottulinae